Salina Cruz is a major seaport on the Pacific coast of the Mexican state of Oaxaca. It is the state's third-largest city and is the municipal seat of the municipality of the same name.  
It is part of the Tehuantepec District in the west of the Istmo Region.
The city had a 2005 census population of 71,314, while its municipality, with an area of  had a population of 76,219, the state's fourth-largest municipality in population.

The port was developed in the late 19th century due to its location at the southern terminus of the Ferrocarril Transístmico, which carried freight across the Isthmus of Tehuantepec.

History
Salina Cruz, was founded by the Spanish in 1522 under whose command Pedro de Alvarado came. It was given the name "Salina de la Santa Cruz" as its official foundation day was the Catholic day of the holy cross.

Salina Cruz is situated near the mouth of the Río Tehuantepec, on the open coast of the Isthmus of Tehuantepec on the Gulf of Tehuantepec, and has no natural harbour. There was only a small Native village before Salina Cruz was chosen as the Pacific terminus of the  Tehuantepec National Railway, whereupon a modern town was laid out and built on adjacent higher ground and an artificial harbour was built by the Mexican government to accommodate the expected traffic. 
The new port was opened to traffic in 1907 and in 1909 its population was largely composed of labourers. The enclosed space is divided into an outer and inner harbour by a double line of quays wide enough to carry six great warehouses with electric cranes on both sides and a number of railway tracks. The works were planned to handle an immense volume of transcontinental freight, and before they were finished four steamship lines had arranged regular calls at Salina Cruz.

The municipality
As municipal seat, Salina Cruz has governing jurisdiction over the following communities:

Agua Blanca, Boca del Río, Colonia el Bosque, Colonia el Mirador, Colonia Estibadores, Colonia Granadillo, Colonia la Brecha, Colonia Miramar, Colonia Santita, Colonia Vista Hermosa, El Ciruelo, El Puentecito, Ensenada de la Ventosa, La Brecha (Rancho Moisés Aquino), La Hacienda (Palo Grande), Las Escolleras, Palo Grande, Playa Azul, Playa Brasil (Brasilito), Salinas del Marqués, San Antonio Monterrey, and San José del Palmar

Climate
Salina Cruz experiences a tropical savanna climate (Köppen: Aw). This is because from November to March the precipitation is much smaller, mainly concentrated in summer similar to Asian monsoons, although it is not categorized as such. The seasons of the year can not be well demarcated, generally better defined by the rainy season in the central months of the year. Although precipitation is 1122.3 mm on average, it is usually concentrated in the summer, with August averaging 330.7 mm and February at only 1.6 mm. It is not uncommon for temperatures to rise from 35 °C at some times of the year even in its coastal location. The winter is unknown and at times there is just something like the end of fall to early spring, the lower averages are above 21 °C, moreover no temperature below 10 °C has been recorded as in the Gulf of Mexico. High temperatures are present for much of the year.  The hours of sunshine are always well above 200 hours a month, totaling 2670.6 in annual average, which shows a pleasant beach climate.

See also
American-Hawaiian Steamship Company

References

Link to tables of population data from Census of 2005 INEGI: Instituto Nacional de Estadística, Geografía e Informática
Oaxaca Enciclopedia de los Municipios de México

External links
Municipio de Salina Cruz Official website
Info about Salina Cruz Regional website
Page related to Salina Cruz History and folklore General Information
Port of Salina Cruz
Review of Last Stop Salina Cruz on The Independent 
Last Stop Salina Cruz  on Amazon

Municipalities of Oaxaca
Port cities and towns on the Mexican Pacific coast
Populated places established in 1522